John Dale Bennett (born November 14, 1930) was an American athlete who competed mainly in the long jump. He was born in Grand Forks, North Dakota. He competed for the United States in the 1956 Summer Olympics held in Melbourne, Australia in the long jump, where he won the silver medal. Bennett attended Marquette University and won two NCAA titles while competing for the school's track and field team.

Bennett is the father of NASCAR talk show host Claire B. Lang, the "First Lady" of NASCAR Radio.

References

 

1930 births
Living people
Sportspeople from Grand Forks, North Dakota
Track and field athletes from North Dakota
Marquette University alumni
Olympic silver medalists for the United States in track and field
Athletes (track and field) at the 1955 Pan American Games
Athletes (track and field) at the 1956 Summer Olympics
American male long jumpers
Medalists at the 1956 Summer Olympics
Pan American Games medalists in athletics (track and field)
Pan American Games gold medalists for the United States
Pan American Games silver medalists for the United States
Medalists at the 1955 Pan American Games